WHBG is a Sports formatted broadcast radio station licensed to Harrisonburg, Virginia, United States, serving Harrisonburg and Rockingham County, Virginia. The station is owned and operated by Saga Communications.

Translator
In addition to the main station, WHBG is relayed by an FM translator to widen its broadcast area.

References

External links
 ESPN Radio 1360AM and 101.3FM Online

1956 establishments in Virginia
Sports radio stations in the United States
Radio stations established in 1956
HBG
ESPN Radio stations